San Martín Huamelulpan is a town in the State of Oaxaca, Mexico, but it is better known simply as Huamelulpan.  It is located just off Federal Highway 190. It is a small community of only 250 people whose main occupation is subsistence farming and fruit orchards.  It is 2,218 meters above sea level with a temperate to cold climate and surrounded by pine trees.

The town promotes ecotourism, especially hiking and horseback riding. About a half a kilometer from the town is located a notable archeological site. This place used to be an important city during the Pre-classic and Classic periods of Mesoamerica. Still visible are terraced fields, plazas, ball fields, tombs and residential areas.

References

Populated places in Oaxaca